Shkelqim Demhasaj (born 19 April 1996) is a professional footballer who plays as a forward for Swiss Super League club Grasshoppers. Born in Switzerland, he plays for the Kosovo national team.

Club career

Luzern
On 22 June 2017, Demhasaj joined Swiss Super League side Luzern, on a three-year contract. On 20 July 2017, he made his debut with Luzern  in the second qualifying round of 2017–18 UEFA Europa League against the Croatian side Osijek after coming on as a substitute at 77th minute in place of Cedric Itten.

Grasshoppers
On 2 July 2020, Demhasaj joined Swiss Challenge League side Grasshoppers, on a three-year contract. During the 2020/21 Challenge League season, he scored ten goals for Grasshopper and notably helped the club achieve promotion to the Super League. 

In the new season, he saw notably less play time, however, and also suffered a dearth of goals scored. As a result, he was loaned out to FC Winterthur on 11 February 2022. He scored in his first game for Winterthur four minutes after coming on in the 61st minute, in a 4-0 win over FC Wil. He also supplied the assist for the final goal of the game. After suffering another injury, he was out of commission between March and May, returning only for the last two games of the season. He scored a second goal for Winterthur in the final game of the season, converting a penalty for the final 5-0 victory over SC Kriens, a victory that was instrumental in securing promotion for Winterthur. It was Demhasaj's second promotion in two years.

He returned to Grasshoppers for the next season.

International career
On 12 November 2018, Demhasaj received an urgent call-up from Kosovo for the 2018–19 UEFA Nations League matches against Malta and Azerbaijan to replace the injured Bersant Celina. On 17 November 2018, he made his debut with Kosovo in a UEFA Nations League match against Malta after coming on as a substitute at 84th minute in place of Vedat Muriqi.

Personal life
Demhasaj was born in Schaffhausen, Switzerland to Kosovo Albanian parents from Donji Crnobreg, a village near Deçan. He holds Kosovan and Swiss passports.

Career statistics

Club

International

References

External links

Shkelqim Demhasaj at FC Luzern

1996 births
Living people
People from Schaffhausen
Sportspeople from the canton of Schaffhausen
Association football forwards
Kosovan footballers
Kosovo international footballers
Swiss men's footballers
Switzerland youth international footballers
Switzerland under-21 international footballers
Swiss people of Kosovan descent
Swiss people of Albanian descent
FC Schaffhausen players
FC Luzern players
Grasshopper Club Zürich players
FC Winterthur players
Swiss Challenge League players
Swiss Super League players